The PWS-4 (PWS - Podlaska Wytwórnia Samolotów - Podlasie Aircraft Factory) was a prototype Polish sports aircraft, developed in 1928 by Podlaska Wytwórnia Samolotów.

Design and development
The PWS-4 was conceived as a cheap and simple single seater sports aircraft. It was designed by August Bobek-Zdaniewski in the Podlaska Wytwórnia Samolotów factory in 1928. The prototype was flown in September 1928 at Biała Podlaska, by Franciszek Rutkowski. It did not enter production due to lack of orders, as the Polish sports aviation movement was interested mostly in more universal two-seater machines. The design was later used as the basis for the PWS-50.

Operational history
The prototype PWS-4 took part in the second Polish Light Aircraft Contest between 29 October-1 November 1928, taking sixth place. Later it was used by the LOPP paramilitary organization in Biała Podlaska. Among others, it was used for aerobatics.

Construction
The PWS-4 was a single-seater high-wing braced monoplane of wooden construction. The fuselage was a wooden frame, covered with plywood, apart from the engine section, which was covered with aluminium sheeting. The empennage structure was wood, with fabric covering.  The rectangular wooden wings had two spars; were covered with plywood in front and fabric in the rear; and were supported with pairs of twin struts. The undercarriage consisted of a fixed common axle conventional landing gear, with a rear skid. Fuel was carried in a tank in the wings, 45 L capacity.

Cruise fuel consumption was 11-13 L/h.

Specification (PWS-4)

Notes

External links

Photos and drawing at Ugolok Neba

1920s Polish sport aircraft
PWS-04
High-wing aircraft
Aircraft first flown in 1928
Single-engined tractor aircraft